Land of the freak is the fifth full-length album of the Seattle rock band Sledgeback. Released in 2014 by Sliver records, the sound of the album is general punk rock.

Track listing
"Snitch" - 1:05
"Kill my feelings" - 1:35
"All night long" - 3:46
"New world order" - 1:25
"The hate" - 3:18
"Land of the freak" - 1:36
"Frustration" - 3:04
"Hooligans" - 2:50
"Never look down" - 1:48
"So long baby" - 3:30
"Come" - 1:55 
"I am" - 3:39
"Wait for you" - 3:31
"Hey ballerina" - 3:53

References

Sledgeback albums
2014 albums